Verily Anderson (12 January 1915 – 16 July 2010) was a British author, best known for writing the screenplay of the 1960 film No Kidding, based on her 1958 book Beware of Children, for writing Brownie books and writing genealogical books about the Gurney, Barclay and Buxton families.

Biography

Born as Verily Bruce on 12 January 1915 in Edgbaston, Birmingham, she was the daughter of Francis Rosslyn Courtenay Bruce and Rachel Gurney, the fourth of her parents' five children.

Verily Bruce was educated at Edgbaston High School for Girls, Birmingham, between the ages of four and seven, then she attended Normanhurst School in Battle, Sussex. At 16, she attended the Royal College of Music in London. She was in the First Aid Nursing Yeomanry between 1938 and 1941.

On 2 August 1940 she married Captain Donald Clive Anderson (1897–1957), son of Frank Anderson, thereafter using the name Verily Anderson for her writing. She achieved success at the age of 41 in 1956 with the publication of Spam Tomorrow, "a deft and frequently uproarious account of her wartime experiences on the home front...a new kind of memoir, one of the first to explore the lives of women in wartime." The Andersons ran a holiday home in Sussex catering for children of parents living abroad – characterised by one newspaper as "infant pandemonium" because of its no-rules philosophy. After her husband died, leaving five children aged from three to 15, Anderson wrote with increased vigour, and her 1958 book, Beware of Children, was adapted for the film No Kidding (1960) by the producers of the Carry On series, starring Leslie Phillips, Geraldine McEwan and Joan Hickson.

Between 1946 and 2002, Anderson also worked with the BBC in TV and radio, on Woman's Hour and writing TV plays.

On 10 August 1971, she married Paul Edward Paget (1901–1985).

She last resided in Frogshall, Northrepps, Norfolk, where she died at home on 16 July 2010, aged 95, just after completing a book, Castellans of Herstmonceux (1911-2010) (Bader International Study Centre, 2011). She is buried with her husband Paul Paget in neighbouring Sidestrand.

Children
Children of Verily Bruce and Captain Donald Clive Anderson:
 Marian O'Hare, designer.
 Rachel Anderson, a writer mostly of children's literature.
 Eddie Anderson, a television producer.
 Janie Anderson (now Janie Hampton), a writer and radio presenter.
 Alexandra Walker (née Anderson), a literacy tutor to young people.

Gurney family history and genealogy 
Verily Anderson was the author two books about the Gurney, Barclay and Buxton families:

Northrepps Grandchildren, published in 1968
Northrepps Hall is a converted farmhouse near Cromer, Norfolk, which has been occupied by the same family for more than eight generations and is now Grade II listed. This family now has thousands of members, many of whom have made their mark on British society. Notable are Thomas Fowell Buxton, of slave-emancipation fame, and Elizabeth Fry, the social reformer. For the Buxton, Barclay and Gurney families, Northrepps Hall has been a focus for many years; Verily Anderson recalls living there and provides a close-up account of family life through the eyes of the many children who used the house over generations.
Friends and Relations, published in 1980. A detailed family history of the Gurney family, using information from family records.

Books

Brownie books
Towards the Golden Hand. A play for Brownies; 1948.
Magic for the Golden Bar, 1953.
Amanda and the Brownies. Illustrated by Joan Milroy; 1960.
The Brownies and the Golden Hand. Illustrated by Edgar Norfield; 1963.
The Brownies and the Ponies. Illustrated by Edgar Norfield; 1965.
Brownies on Wheels, 1966.
The Brownies and the Wedding Day, 1974.
Brownies' Cook-Book, 1974.
The Brownies and the Christening, 1977.
Brownies' Day Abroad, 1984.

Other children's books
Vanload to Venice. Illustrated by Margaret Ingram; 1961.
Clover Coverdale, 1966.
Camp Fire Cook-Book, 1976.

Autobiography
Spam Tomorrow, 1956.
Our Square, 1957.
Beware of Children, 1958.
Daughters of Divinity, 1960.
Nine Times Never. Illustrated by Edward Lewis; 1962.
The Flo Affair, 1963.
The Yorks in London. Illustrated by Nathaniel Mayer; 1964.
Scrambled Egg for Christmas; line drawings by Marian O'Hare; 1970.

Biography
The Northrepps Grandchildren, 1968.
The Last of the Eccentrics: A Life of Rosslyn Bruce, 1972.
Friends and Relations, 1980.
The De Veres of Castle Hedingham, 1993.
Castellans of Herstmonceux (1911–2010), 2011.

Film
Beware of Children, 1960, renamed No Kidding in North America. Directed by Gerald Thomas and starring Leslie Phillips, Geraldine McEwan, Julia Lockwood.

See also

 www.janiehampton.co.uk
 www.rachelanderson.co.uk

References

External links
 The De Vere Society

1915 births
2010 deaths
Alumni of the Royal College of Music
English children's writers
People from Northrepps
20th-century English novelists
Burials in Norfolk